John Oakley Spencer, Ph.D., LL.D. (July 11, 1857 – May 24, 1947) was an ordained minister and college administrator who served as the 4th President of Morgan State University from 1902 to 1937. Dr. Spencer's Presidency is considered to be a renaissance period and the first "Era of Progress" for Morgan, in which the campus underwent major transformations. The other "Era's of Progress" were under the Presidency of Martin D. Jenkins, Ph.D. (1948–1970) and during the Presidency of Earl S. Richardson (1984–2010).

Biography

Dr. Spencer was born on July 11, 1857 in Lynn, Susquehanna County, Pennsylvania. He was educated at Keystone Academy in Factoryville, Pennsylvania. Afterwards, he attended Illinois Wesleyan University in Bloomington, Illinois, followed by Columbia University and Oxford University. Dr. Spencer was an ordained minister and member of the Baltimore Conference, Methodist Episcopal Church.

Dr. Spencer became President of Morgan College in 1902, and served in that position until 1937. During his tenure as president, the University saw major expansions across the campus. It also saw the first "Era of Progress" as the College transformed from a college supported by the religious community (which focused primarily upon training young men and women for the ministry) to a college gaining support from private foundations, and offering liberal arts degrees for a variety of professions. Also during this period, Morgan College received its first accreditation by the Middle States Association of Colleges and Schools.

References

External links

"The History of Morgan State University" at C-SPAN

1857 births
1947 deaths
Presidents of Morgan State University
People from Susquehanna County, Pennsylvania